Karl Umrigar (4 October 1960 – 3 May 1979) born to a Parsi family, was a champion Indian jockey in the 1970's. His family sponsors a Karl Umrigar Trophy every year in his memory. 

He is survived by his parents Jimmy and Nan Umrigar, his sister Tina who is married to champion Jockey and Horse Trainer Pesi Shroff. Karl became a famous Indian jockey at the age of 17.

In the 1978-79 Mahalaxmi racing season, Karl Umrigar who rode 144 mounts that season with 54 winners, 33 seconds, 22 thirds and 17 fourths, only 18 of his rides failing to finish in the frame.

He met with a tragic accident on the racetrack when the horse Vasudha, threw him off her back. He slipped into coma at the Breach Candy hospital and died on 3 May 1979.

References 

Parsi people
Parsi people from Mumbai
Jockeys who died while racing
1960 births
1979 deaths
Indian jockeys